Maryvale Station is a pastoral lease that operates as a cattle station in the Northern Territory of Australia.

The ephemeral Finke and the Hugh River both flow through the property but it is still dependent on bores and dams for watering stock. The Indigenous Australian community of Titjikala is situated within the boundaries of the station. The property shares a boundary with Horseshoe Bend Station to the south, Allambi to the east, Deep Well and Orange Creek to the north and with Henbury and Idracowra Stations to the west.

The unusual rock formation, Chambers Pillar is situated within the station boundaries.

The property has an average stocking rate of approximately 6,500 head of cattle. It is equipped with a three bedroom homestead, a four bedroom staff house, workers' quarters, workshop, sheds, cattle yards and is divided into 14 paddocks.

 the  property was still on the market along with at least 15 others in the Kimberley and Northern Territory.

Early history

Maryvale Station is named after Mary Hayes, wife of William Hayes, who owned the station in the early 1900s, along with Owen Springs Station, Mount Burrell Station, Deep Well Station and Undoolya Station.

See also
List of ranches and stations

References

Stations (Australian agriculture)
Pastoral leases in the Northern Territory